Liu Huaqing (1 October 1916 – 14 January 2011) was Chinese revolutionary and an admiral of the People's Liberation Army Navy, who served as the third Commander-in-Chief of the Navy from 1982 through 1988.  He is considered to have greatly contributed to the modernization of the Chinese Navy, and is hailed as the "father of the modern Chinese Navy" and "father of Chinese aircraft carriers".

Biography 
Taking over the role of Navy Commander-in-Chief from his predecessor Ye Fei (who retired due to health problems), Liu had outlined a three-step process by which China would have a navy of global reach by the second half of the 21st century. In step one, from 2000 to 2010, China would develop a naval force that could operate up to the first island chain.  In step two, from 2010 to 2020, China's navy would become a regional force capable of projecting force to the second island chain.  In step three, to be achieved by 2040, China would possess a blue-water navy centered around aircraft carriers. He was a strong advocate of the Chinese aircraft carrier programme.

Liu encouraged technological innovation within China that would increase naval capabilities, but he also advocated large foreign purchases.  During the 1960s and 1970s, Liu was responsible for naval research and development before heading national military research. He was also the top commander of the troops enforcing martial law to suppress the Tiananmen Square protests on 3–4 June 1989. From 1992 to 1997 Liu was a member of the Politburo Standing Committee.  He was the last Standing Committee member of an active military personnel. Since he left the Standing Committee in 1997, no other military leader has sat on the committee.

Liu remained active through the mid-1990s and appeared in uniform at 2007 commemorations of the 80th anniversary of the founding of the People's Liberation Army in Beijing.

Liu died on 14 January 2011 in Beijing. His son Liu Zhuoming is a vice admiral of the PLA Navy. His daughter Liu Chaoying, a former lieutenant colonel in the PLA, was a major figure in the 1996 United States campaign finance controversy.

References

External links 
  Biography of Liu Huaqing
 Ruminations about how little we know about the PLA Navy. Conference on Chinese Military Affairs, 10 October 2000

1916 births
2011 deaths
Commanders of the People's Liberation Army Navy
Chinese military writers
Chinese military personnel of World War II
People's Republic of China writers
N. G. Kuznetsov Naval Academy alumni
People from Xiaogan
Writers from Hubei
Members of the 14th Politburo Standing Committee of the Chinese Communist Party
Military theorists